16th National Assembly may refer to:

 16th National Assembly of France
 16th National Assembly of South Korea

